Abd al-Mu'in Mallouhi (Arabic: عبد المعين الملوحي) is a Syrian poet born in Homs in 1917. He was a journalist, who marked his signature using the pseudonym “chronic communist” and  became known by that name. He has many works, but most notably, he is known for his poem "Fate and Crime" (original: Qadar wa-jarīmah), which was printed but subsequently banned from distribution. The complete version has never been published and the poem is circulated through handwritten copies, yet it strangely became widespread. The poem is a eulogy to his wife, Buheira, who died of cancer.

Early life 

Mallouhi was born in Homs, Syria, in 1917. He died on the 21st of March 2006. His first poem was published in 1936. The first book he translated was Fragments from My Diary by Maxim Gorky in 1944. He started working as a teacher in 1945, he taught in Homs, Latakia and Hama.

He is one of the founders of the Syrian Writers’ Association (1951) and a member of the Arab Writers Union in Syria. He worked as a director of antiquities at the Ministry of Culture. He also worked as a director of cultural centre and later became a cultural advisor at the Presidential Palace. He retired in 1976. Mallouhi once visited Syrian president Hafez al-Assad, who used to be his student, and when asked of his requests, he asked for permission to print a translation of Vietnamese poetry. Following which he received the Vietnamese Friendship Order. He had also received many medals, including one from Bologna. In addition, he was appointed Honorary Professor title by Peking University. It is also worth noting that Poet Abd al-Mu'in Mallouhi was a member of the Arab Academy of Damascus. He wrote many newspaper articles, particularly for Sawt al-Shaab newspaper, which was issued in Damascus. He used to mark his articles with his name followed by the title “chronic communist”.

Works 
Abd al-Mu'in Mallouhi enriched the Arab library with many works, including:

 Palms Taste of Hunger (original: Ṭa'm al-Nakhlā Ṭa'm al-jūʻ) (story)
 Snow on a Grave (original: Thalj ʻalá qabr)
 Fate and Crime (original: Qadar wa-jarīmah) (poem)
 Roses (original: Wurūd) (poem)
Abd al-Mu'in Mallouhi's Own Obituary (original: ʻAbd al-Muʻīn Mallūḥī yarthī nafsah)

His knowledge did not stop at poetry, stories and investigations, as he had translated many books to Arabic. He translated some of the works of Maxim Gorky, Lenin, Rasul Gamzatov and Bernard Shaw. He also was the first to translate Dostoevsky’s works and Vietnamese poetry.

Having started writing poetry at the age of 12, he left behind over 96 printed books and many manuscripts.

Fate and crime 
Fate and Crime is a eulogy composed of 186 verses. It was written in 1949 and it had been and continues to be controversial. It was banned from distribution soon after it was printed. To this day, the full version of the poem has not been printed. Only parts of it were printed within books that discussed the poem and the poet who wrote it.

Fate and Crime is a unique elegiac, philosophical and atheistical poem. Mallouhi was the first poet to dare to write about atheism, not only that, but he also dared to launch an attack to open a new door in the face of Arabic literature when only few ever dared to do so. It is said that Poet Abd al-Mu'in Mallouhi wrote a poem apologizing even though he had previously said that this is who he was and who he still is. All in all, it cannot be said that Fate and Crime was not an epic poem. Poet Shahir Nasr called him a “legendary poet of eulogies,” and that might have been for the fame of his two poems, Fate and Crime and Roses.

References 

Syrian poets
Communist writers
Arab communists
21st-century Syrian writers